Kukko (meaning 'rooster' in Finnish) is a Finnish beer brand.

Kukko may also refer to:
 Emil Kukko (1888–1963), Finnish athlete
 Sakari Kukko (born 1953), Finnish saxophonist and flutist

See also 
 Kalakukko ("fish cock")